Frank George Wisner II (born July 2, 1938) is an American businessman and former diplomat who had served as acting United States Secretary of State for a few hours following the resignation of the previous acting United States Secretary of State Arnold Kanter at noon on January 20, 1993 until the confirmation by the United States Senate and swearing in of Warren Christopher as United States Secretary of State later that day. He is the son of CIA official Frank Wisner (1909–1965). On January 31, 2011, he was sent to Egypt by President Barack Obama to negotiate a resolution to the popular protests against the regime that had swept the country. A White House spokesman said that Wisner had vast experience in the region as well as close relationships with many Egyptians in and out of government. The New York Times reported that he was a personal friend of former Egyptian president Hosni Mubarak.

He works as an international-affairs advisor at the firm of Squire Patton Boggs in Washington, DC.

Life and career
Wisner was born in New York on July 2, 1938. He joined the State Department as a Foreign Service Officer in December 1961.

He was assigned as a vice consul at the American Consulate General in Tangier, Morocco. He served as third secretary at the U.S. Embassy in Algiers, Algeria. In 1964 he became a rural development officer at the U.S. Embassy in Saigon, South Vietnam, for the Agency for International Development. He served in South Vietnam until 1969, when he returned to the State Department as officer in charge of Tunisian affairs. From 1971 to 1973, he was first secretary at the U.S. Embassy in Tunis, Tunisia, and following that, from 1973 to 1974, he was first secretary at the U.S. Embassy in Dacca, Bangladesh. From 1974 to 1975, he was Director of the Office of Plans and Management in the Bureau of Public Affairs and in late 1975 became Deputy Director of the President's Indo-China Task Force in the Department.

In 1976, at the beginning of the Carter administration, he served under Cyrus Vance as Deputy Executive Secretary of the Department of State. Among his overseas assignments, Wisner served as the United States Ambassador to Zambia (1979–82); Egypt (1986–91), the Philippines (1991–92), and India, 1994–97.

During his tenure in Lusaka, he played the role of point man for the Constructive Engagement policy of assistant secretary of state for African affairs Chester Crocker. Wisner worked well with Zambian president Kenneth Kaunda and helped to rebuild bilateral relations between Zambia and the USA after a 1980 spy scandal at the U.S. embassy in Lusaka. Crocker's efforts contributed to the organization and successful discussions at the February 1984 Lusaka Conference regarding conflicts in Angola and Namibia.

After retiring from government service in 1997, Wisner joined the board at a subsidiary of Enron, the former energy company and served on the board of American International Group (AIG).

In late 2002, Wisner co-chaired an independent working group that developed a model for the US's post-conflict role in Iraq, should an invasion occur. Their published recommendations included: the establishment of law and order through the retraining of the Iraqi army, focusing on the distribution of humanitarian assistance and reestablishment of vital services, and the importance of avoiding the appointment of exiled Iraqi opposition leaders to dominant positions in the new government.

Wisner is an advisory board member for the Partnership for a Secure America, a not-for-profit organization dedicated to recreating the bipartisan center in American national security and foreign policy. In 2012 he succeeded Paul A. Volcker as chairman of the board of trustees of International House, a cultural-exchange residence and program center in New York City. He also serves on the advisory board of the National Security Network, and on the board of Refugees International. He went on to become a member of the board for EOG Resources. In June 2013, Wisner joined the advisory board of Ergo, a global intelligence and advisory firm.  Wisner is chair of the board of directors of The Arab Gulf States Institute in Washington.

Frank Wisner was married to Christine de Ganay, the stepmother of Nicolas Sarkozy, the President of France from 2007 until 2012.

He is a member of the Metropolitan Club of Washington DC.

2011 Egypt protests
In early 2011, the Obama administration asked Wisner to carry views to Egyptian leader Hosni Mubarak, including advice that Mubarak should resign to defuse the crisis. Wisner was unsuccessful in convincing Mubarak to do so. Four days later, after a day in which Mubarak allies took violent reprisal against democracy activists, Wisner spoke to a security conference in Europe and called it "crucial" that Mubarak stay on in the interest of "stability." The State Department immediately disavowed his comments and said Wisner had not been serving as an envoy but as a conduit for certain administration views.

References

External links

Obama Egypt Envoy Frank Wisner Says Mubarak Should Stay – video report by Democracy Now!

1938 births
Living people
20th-century American businesspeople
American people of German descent
Princeton University alumni
Businesspeople from New York City
Ambassadors of the United States to the Philippines
Ambassadors of the United States to India
Ambassadors of the United States to Egypt
Ambassadors of the United States to Zambia
United States Career Ambassadors
United States Under Secretaries of Defense for Policy
American University of Beirut trustees
United States Under Secretaries of State
People of the Egyptian revolution of 2011
United States Foreign Service personnel
Acting United States Secretaries of State
20th-century American diplomats
People associated with Squire Patton Boggs